Michael Haydn's Symphony No. 19 in D major, Perger 11, Sherman 19, MH 198, was written in Salzburg in 1774.

Scored for flute, 2 oboes, 2 bassoons, 2 horns (featured prominently in the Andante second movement), and strings, in four movements:

Allegro
Andante, in D minor
Minuet and Trio (the latter in D minor)
Presto assai

Of the symphonies with Minuets, this is one of the few to have a minor key trio (another is Symphony No. 5).

References

 A. Delarte, "A Quick Overview Of The Instrumental Music Of Michael Haydn" Bob's Poetry Magazine November 2006: 20 PDF
 Charles H. Sherman and T. Donley Thomas, Johann Michael Haydn (1737 - 1806), a chronological thematic catalogue of his works. Stuyvesant, New York: Pendragon Press (1993)
 C. Sherman, "Johann Michael Haydn" in The Symphony: Salzburg, Part 2 London: Garland Publishing (1982): lxviii

Symphony 19
1774 compositions
Compositions in D major